It is estimated that in the Middle East, over 900,000 people profess Buddhism as their religion. Buddhist adherents make up just over 0.3% of the Middle East total population. Many of these Buddhists are workers who have migrated from Asia to the Middle East since the late 1990s, many of them come from countries that have large Buddhist populations, such as China, Vietnam, Thailand, Sri Lanka, and Nepal.

Demographics
Theravada Buddhism is the predominant religion of workers from Thailand and Sri Lanka. Mahayana Buddhism is the predominant religion of workers from East Asia and Vietnam, although Taoism, Confucianism, and Shinto are also represented among these people. In Dubai (the United Arab Emirates) and Qatar, the workers from Sri Lanka were allowed to celebrate Vesak (the most important holiday in Buddhism) in those Islamic countries.

Saudi Arabia

It is estimated that there are 13.49 million foreign residents are living and working in Saudi Arabia.

In addition to 400,000 Sri Lankans, there are a few thousand Buddhist workers from East Asia, the majority of whom are Chinese, Vietnamese, and Thai. A number of Tibetan-Nepalese immigrants may also be among the foreign population of Saudi Arabia.

Thus approximately 1.5% of Saudi Arabia's population – or around 400,000 people – are Buddhist, likely giving Saudi Arabia the largest Buddhist community in either the Middle East or the Arab World

Population by country

See also 

 Buddhism in the West
 Hinduism in Arab states
 Index of Buddhism-related articles
 Tel Aviv Zen Center

External links
 Buddhist pagodas or temples in Middle East

References

 The U.S. State Department's International Religious Freedom Report 2006
 CIA FactBook 
 Religious Freedom page
 Religious Intelligence

Middle East
Religion in the Middle East
Middle e